Hoxie may refer to:

Places 
United States
 Hoxie, Arkansas, a city in Lawrence County
 Hoxie, Kansas, a city in Sheridan County
 the Hoxie meteorite landed near Hoxie, Kansas (see meteorite falls)

Ships 
 SS Hoxie, American cargo ship built in 1918
 Harriet Hoxie, American clipper ship built in 1851

Other uses 
 Hoxie (surname)
 Hoxie House, one of the oldest houses on Cape Cod, Massachusetts